Victoria Kelly name may refer to:

 Tori Kelly, American singer
 Victoria Kelly (New Zealand Composer)